The 1966–67 Kansas Jayhawks men's basketball team represented the University of Kansas during the 1966–67 college men's basketball season.

Roster
Rodger Bohnenstiehl
Jo Jo White
Ron Franz
Vernon Vanoy
Phil Harmon
Bruce Sloan*
Bob Wilson
Howard Arndt
Rich Thomas
Pat Davis
George Yarnevich
Jaye Edlger

Schedule

References

Kansas Jayhawks men's basketball seasons
Kansas
Kansas
Kansas
Kansas